Julius Richard Petri (31 May 185220 December 1921) was a German microbiologist who is generally credited with inventing the device known as the Petri dish, which is named after him, while working as assistant to bacteriologist Robert Koch.

Life and career
Petri was born in the town of Barmen (now a district of the city of Wuppertal), Germany, on 31 May 1852. He came from a distinguished family of scholars, and was the eldest son of Philipp Ulrich Martin Petri (18171864), a professor in Berlin, and Louise Petri. Petri's grandfather, Viktor Friedrich Leberecht Petri (1782-1857), was also a scholar, being both a director and professor at  the Collegium Carolinum in Braunschweig, Germany.

Petri first studied medicine at the Kaiser Wilhelm Academy for Military Physicians (18711875) and received his medical degree in 1876. He continued his studies at the Charité Hospital in Berlin where his thesis on the chemistry on protein urine tests earned him his doctorate. He was on active duty as a military physician until 1882, continuing then as a reservist.

From 1877 to 1879 he was assigned to the Imperial Health Office in Berlin, where he became an assistant to Robert Koch. On the suggestion of Angelina Hesse, the New York-born wife of another assistant, Walther Hesse, the Koch laboratory began to culture bacteria on agar plates. Petri then invented the standard culture dish, or Petri plate, and further developed the technique of agar culture to purify or clone bacterial colonies derived from single cells. This advance made it possible to rigorously identify the bacteria responsible for diseases.

Petri was married twice in his lifetime. His first wife, Anna Riesch, died in 1894 during childbirth. In 1897, Petri got married again to a woman named Elizabeth Turk.

Importance of the Petri dish and his discoveries 
 Petri dishes are used as research plates for microbiology studies. The dish is partially filled with warm liquid containing agar, and a mixture of specific ingredients that may include nutrients, blood, salts, carbohydrates, dyes, indicators, amino acids and antibiotics. After the agar cools and solidifies, the dish is ready to receive a microbe-laden sample in a process known as inoculation or "plating". For virus or phage cultures, a two-step inoculation is needed: bacteria that is grown acts like a host for the viral inoculum.

The bacterial sample is diluted on the plate in a process called "streaking": a sterile plastic stick, or a wire loop which is sterilized by heating it, the loop is used to collect the first sample, and then make a streak on the dish with the agar. Then, using a fresh stick and sterilized loop, they pass the new loop through that initial streak, and it spreads the plated bacteria onto the dish. This process is repeated a third time, and if necessary a fourth, resulting in individual bacterial cells that are isolated on the plate, which then are capable to divide and grow into single "clonal" bacterial colonies.

Petri plates can be incubated upside down (agar on top), which can help lessen the risk of contamination from airborne particles settling and to decrease and prevent the chance of condensation from water, from accumulating and disturbing the microbes being cultured.

Scientists have long been growing cells in natural and synthetic matrix environments to elicit phenotypes that are not expressed on conventionally rigid substrates. Unfortunately, growing cells either on or within soft matrices can be an expensive, labor-intensive, and impractical undertaking.

The basic design of the Petri dish has not changed since being created by Petri in 1887. They were struggling to keep the dishes free of dust and extra bacteria that could collect and alter their samples, so they were using heavy bell jars which proved ineffective, after 6 years Petri created transparent plates that were slightly larger than his Petri dishes so it could act as a transparent lid.

After his work inventing the Petri dish, Petri left Koch's laboratory and ran the Göbersdorf sanatorium for Tuberculosis patients from the years 1882 to 1885. After running the Göbersdorf sanatorium he became the director of the Museum of Hygiene in Berlin in the year 1886. Not only did Petri have many innovations and inventions, but Petri also published many different papers. Petri published 150 papers on the topic of bacteriology and hygiene which contributed lots of new information and concepts.

Works 
Attempts at the chemistry of proteins. 1876.
Methods of modern bacteria research (in: Collection Exoteric Scientific Lectures). 1887.
The danger of carbon soda furnaces. 1889.
Industrial hygiene. 1890.
Experiments on the spread of contagious diseases, especially tuberculosis, by the railway and on  measures to be taken. 1893.
The microscope. From its beginnings to the present perfection. 1896.
A judgment of highpressure Pasteurising apparatus 1897.
Towards quality testing in butter and milk. 1897.
Apparatus for determination of water content in milk by distillation in a vacuum.

References

External links
 Whonamedit
 Petri dish
 Walther and Fanny Hesse

1852 births
1921 deaths
19th-century German biologists
German microbiologists
German bacteriologists
Scientists from Wuppertal
20th-century German biologists